The 1995 Vuelta a Asturias was the 39th edition of the Vuelta a Asturias road cycling stage race, which was held from 16 May to 21 May 1995. The race started and finished in Oviedo. The race was won by Beat Zberg of the  team.

General classification

References

Further reading

Vuelta Asturias
1995 in road cycling
1995 in Spanish sport